Clinton Airport  was a privately owned, public-use airport located  north of the central business district of Clinton, a city in Vermillion County, Indiana, United States.

Facilities and aircraft 
It has one runway designated 18/36 with a 3,750 by 40 ft (1,143 x 12 m) asphalt surface.

For the 12-month period ending December 31, 2004, the airport had 6,026 general aviation aircraft operations, an average of 16 per day. At that time there were 11 single-engine aircraft based at this airport.

Airport Closure 
As of May 1, 2017, an FAA NOTAM indicates that the Clinton Airport is permanently closed.

References

External links 
 Aerial photo from INDOT Airport Directory
 Aerial photo as of March 1999 from USGS The National Map

Defunct airports in Indiana
Airports in Indiana
Transportation buildings and structures in Vermillion County, Indiana